Kourtney and Kim Take New York is an American reality television series that premiered January 23, 2011, on E! and ran for two seasons. The series followed sisters Kim Kardashian and Kourtney Kardashian as they opened a Dash boutique in New York City. Kourtney and Kim Take New York is the second spin-off of Keeping Up with the Kardashians.

Premise
Kourtney and Kim Take New York follows Kourtney Kardashian as she leaves Los Angeles once more, this time followed by younger sister Kim, to open a third Dash retail store, in New York City. Kim and Kourtney started shooting a second season in August 2011.

On October 26, 2011, E! announced that the series has been renewed for a second season. The second season was filmed following Kim's marriage to basketball player Kris Humphries that month. However, the season was reworked to focus more on the couple's troubles after Kardashian filed for divorce in October 2011. The second season premiered on November 27, 2011, and the premiere episode acquired 3.1 million viewers.

Cast

Main
 Kourtney Kardashian
 Kim Kardashian
 Scott Disick

Supporting
 Khloé Kardashian  (seasons 1–2)
 Kris Jenner (seasons 1–2)
 Mason Disick (season 2), Kourtney and Scott's son.
 Kris Humphries (season 2), Kim's then husband, now ex-husband.
 Jonathan Cheban (season 2), Kim's best friend
 Kanye West

Episodes

Series overview

Season 1 (2011)

Season 2 (2011–12)

References

External links 
 
 

2010s American reality television series
2011 American television series debuts
2012 American television series endings
English-language television shows
Television series by Bunim/Murray Productions
Television series by Ryan Seacrest Productions
Television shows set in New York City
Keeping Up with the Kardashians
Reality television spin-offs
Television shows related to the Kardashian–Jenner family
E! original programming
Kim Kardashian
American television spin-offs